Tsaneri is a valley glacier located on the southern slopes of the Greater Caucasus Mountain Range in the Svaneti Region of Georgia. The glacier lies at and above the source the river Mulkhra. Tsaneri consists of two branches that feed off of the adjacent glaciers that are located on the slopes of Mt. Tikhtengeni, Lalveri, Tetnuldi, and Gistola.

Size 
In the 19th century, Tsaneri Glacier was the second largest glacier in Georgia after the glacier Tviberi Glacier: according to topographic maps  from 1887, the surface of the glacier with the connected Nageba Glacier was about 48.9 km².

In 1960, the area of Tsaneri Glacier without the Nageba Glacier was about 28.3 km2. In the following years, the glacier was divided into the southern and northern parts, which in 2014 covered respectively 12.6 km² and 11.5 km².

See also
Glaciers of Georgia

References 

Glaciers of Georgia (country)
Svaneti